The Great Salt Lake Council was a local council of the BSA (BSA) which is now part of the Crossroads of the West Council. The Great Salt Lake Council served the Utah counties of Salt Lake, Tooele and Summit, as well as much of Davis County. In April 2020, it combined with the former Trapper Trails and Utah National Parks councils.

Prior to the Church of Jesus Christ of Latter-day Saints ending its relationships with the BSA, it was the organization's second largest council.

History
In 1916, the Salt Lake City Council (#590) was formed. It changed its name to the Salt Lake and South Davis Counties Council  (#590) in 1926, changing it again in 1926 to Salt Lake City Area Council(#590). In 1951 it changed its name to Great Salt Lake Council (#590).

In April 2020, it combined with the former Utah National Parks and Trapper Trails councils to create the new Crossroads of the West Council.

Organization
The council was divided into 22 districts.

Camps
The council operated the following camps:

Camp Steiner
Hinckley Scout Ranch - East Fork Scout Camp, Ridgeline High Adventure, Camp Sunrise Girls Camp
Millcreek Canyon - Camp Tracy, Cub Country, Camp Traci Girls Camp
Bear Lake Aquatics Base
Teton High Adventure Base

Girls at Camp
For years before the BSA allowed younger girls in the program the Millcreek Canyon Camps allowed girls to attend camp to enjoy Millcreek Canyon. For girls ages 8 to 9 years-old, they may attend Cub Country camps. And for girls ages 10 to 11 years-old, they may attend Camp Traci for Girls. Girls over the age of 11 were able to attend Camp Sunrise at Hinckley Scout Ranch.

El-Ku-Ta Lodge
The first Ordeal for the El-Ku-Ta Lodge of the Order of the Arrow was held at Camp Steiner in June 1956. The ceremony team that conducted the ceremony could have either been from the Ogden area or from the Tannu Lodge in Reno, Nevada, or the ceremony was possibly conducted by the Steiner camp staff themselves. Induction weekends were typically held at the Tooele Wigwam or at Frontier Fort in Millcreek Canyon up until the dissolving of the lodge in 2020.

See also
 Scouting in Utah
 Operation On-Target

References

Further reading

Defunct local councils of the Boy Scouts of America
Youth organizations based in Utah
Western Region (Boy Scouts of America)
1930 establishments in Utah